Nettie Honeyball, also referred to as Nettie J. Honeyball, was the founder of the British Ladies' Football Club, the first known women's association football club, and one of their players until spring 1895. The name Nettie Honeyball was a pseudonym, and her real name is unknown. Some people believe that her real name was Mary Hutson. When Honeyball formed the BLFC, she was living in Crouch End, but it is not known whether she was from the area. There have been suggestions that she may have been from a middle class family in Pimlico.

Career

In 1894, Honeyball began placing newspapers adverts for players for a women's football team. Thirty women responded, and so the British Ladies' Football Club (BLFC) was formed by Honeyball and Lady Florence Dixie in 1895, and was mainly composed of middle-class women. Honeyball described football as "a manly game that could be womanly as well." Due to Honeyball's PR campaign, the BLFC's first match in 1895 had an attendance of over 12,000 people. Scottish suffragist Helen Matthews, known for forming Mrs Graham's XI, played for the BLFC in 1895. Honeyball's last recorded appearance for the BLFC was on 13 May 1895.

Legacy 
Nettie Honeyball featured in the exhibition Goal Power at Brighton Museum in 2022.

References 

English women's footballers
Year of birth missing
Year of death missing
19th-century births
20th-century deaths
Women's association footballers not categorized by position